Kiznersky District (Kizner joros) is an administrative and municipal district (raion), one of the twenty-five in the Udmurt Republic, Russia. It is located in the southwest of the republic. Its administrative center is the rural locality (a settlement) of Kizner. Population:  23,502 (2002 Census);  The population of Kizner accounts for 47.1% of the district's total population.

Geography
Major rivers in the district include the Vyatka, the Kazanka, the Pyzhmanka, the Lyuga, and the Umyak.

Demographics
Ethnic composition (according to the 2002 Census):
Udmurts: 46%
Russians: 44.8%
Tatars: 6.8%

Economy
District's economy is based on agriculture.

References

Sources

Districts of Udmurtia